Bill Edwards may refer to:

Big Bill Edwards (1877–1943), American football player, guard for Princeton University football team, first president of first American Football League
Bill Edwards (basketball) (born 1971), retired American basketball player
Bill Edwards (actor) (1918–1999), American film and TV actor
Bill Edwards (English footballer) (1874–after 1896), English footballer with Small Heath
Bill Edwards (Australian footballer) (1933–2018), Australian rules footballer with Richmond
Bill Edwards (American football coach) (1905–1987),  American football player and coach
Bill Edwards (offensive lineman) (1920–2009), American football offensive lineman for the New York Giants
Bill Edwards (businessman), St. Petersburg, Florida businessman
Billy Edwards (boxer) (1844–1907), boxer
Billy Edwards (footballer, born 1952), English footballer
Billy Edwards (footballer, born 1895) (1896–1952), English footballer

See also
William Edwards (disambiguation)